Right to Dream Park, historically known as Farum Park, is a football stadium, located in Farum, Denmark, and is the home ground of FC Nordsjælland. It has a capacity of 10,300 of which 9,800 are seated. Farum Park is the first stadium in the Danish Superliga with an artificial turf, installed in 2012. The grass is from Limonta Sport - a leading company in the production and distribution of synthetic grass for sports. Farum Park is a modern stadium with LED-banners, a hotel with 35 rooms and a fitness center.

Farum Park was renamed Right to Dream Park in 2016 as a tribute to the club's partnership with Right to Dream Academy in Ghana.

National games
Right to Dream Park has three times been used as home ground for the Denmark women's national football team. Further it has been venue of several youth and women's national matches:

Attendance average for FC Nordsjælland in Right to Dream Park

See also
 FC Nordsjælland
 List of football stadiums in Denmark

References

External links
 Right to Dream Park at F.C. Nordsjælland  
 Stadium at www.stadiumguide.com

FC Nordsjælland
Football venues in Denmark
Buildings and structures in Furesø Municipality
1999 establishments in Denmark
Sports venues completed in 1999